Alteidet is a small coastal village along the Lille Altafjord in the eastern part of Kvænangen Municipality in Troms og Finnmark county, Norway. There are about 130 residents living in the area and one hotel.

The village was an old trading post, but it was not rebuilt after World War II.  The village is located on a forested isthmus and is near the villages of Storeng and Jøkelfjord.  The name Alteidet is a combination of "Alta" and "eidet" meaning the isthmus of Alta.

References

External links
Picture of Alteidet

Villages in Troms
Kvænangen
Populated places of Arctic Norway